Ashok Singh (born 12 January 1955) is an Indian politician. He was elected from Rae Bareli on the BJP ticket for the 11th and 12th Lok Sabha.

He married Kiran Singh on 21 May 1977 and they have two sons and one daughter.

Positions held
1987: Block Pramukh, Amawa, Rae Bareli
1989-92: Member, Uttar Pradesh Legislative Assembly (two terms)
1996: Elected to 11th Lok Sabha 
1996-98: Member, Committee on Urban and Rural Development
1998: Re-elected to 12th Lok Sabha (2nd term)
1998-99: Member, Committee on Human Resource Development and its Sub-Committee on Drug Control
Member, Consultative Committee, Ministry of Petroleum and Natural Gas
Chairman, District. Co-operative Bank Ltd. since 1994

References

India MPs 1996–1997
India MPs 1998–1999
1955 births
Living people
Lok Sabha members from Uttar Pradesh
Uttar Pradesh MLAs 1989–1991
Uttar Pradesh MLAs 1993–1996
People from Raebareli
Bharatiya Janata Party politicians from Uttar Pradesh